The 2018 Speedway Grand Prix season was the 24th season of the Speedway Grand Prix era, and decided the 73rd FIM Speedway World Championship. It was the eighteenth series under the promotion of Benfield Sports International, an IMG company.

The world title was won by Tai Woffinden, who finished 10 points ahead of Bartosz Zmarzlik in second with Fredrik Lindgren taking the bronze medal. It was Woffinden's third world title, following his wins in 2013 and 2015, making him the most successful British rider in history. Defending champion Jason Doyle finished the season in seventh place.

Qualification 
For the 2018 season there were 15 permanent riders, joined at each Grand Prix by one wild card and two track reserves.

The top eight riders from the 2017 championship qualified automatically. Those riders were joined by the three riders who qualified via the Grand Prix Challenge.

The final four riders were nominated by series promoters, Benfield Sports International, following the completion of the 2017 season.

Qualified riders

Qualified substitutes 

The following riders were nominated as substitutes:

Calendar

The 2018 season consisted of 10 events, two less than the 2017 series.

Final Classification

See also 
 2018 Individual Speedway Junior World Championship

References

External links 
 SpeedwayGP.com – Speedway World Championships

 
2018
Grand Prix